Hugh Berry "Bud" Fate (December 4, 1929 – February 25, 2021) was an American politician and dentist in the state of Alaska.

Early life and career
Fate was born in Mountain View, California. He graduated from La Grande High School in La Grande, Oregon in 1948. In 1951, he moved to Alaska, living in Fairbanks and Umiat. From 1951 to 1953, he served in the United States Army Signal Corps.

In addition to his career in politics and military service, Fate worked as a dentist, gold miner, carpenter, fisherman, dog musher, bush pilot, real estate developer, and author. In a speech on the floor of the U.S. Senate, his son-in-law Dan Sullivan referred to Fate as "an Alaskan renaissance man" and a "legend across Alaska." He was the chairman of the Fairbanks Chamber of Commerce.

Political career
Fate represented Fairbanks in the Alaska House of Representatives from 2002 to 2005, serving as a Republican. Fate served as vice chair of the House Committees on Resources, State Affairs, Oil and Gas, and the Legislative Budget & Audit Committee. He additionally served on Finance subcommittees on Fish & Game, Transportation & Public Facilities, and Revenue.

Fate also served as vice chair of the Alaska Republican Party. Outside of office, he also served as the president of the University of Alaska Board of Regents, trustee of the University of Alaska Foundation, president of the Alaska State Board of Dental Examiners, chairman of the Alaska Land Use Council Advisory Committee, and member of the Alaska Local Boundary Commission.

Family
He was married to Mary Jane Fate, an Athabascan leader. They had three daughters. Their daughter Julie is married to United States Senator Dan Sullivan of Alaska.

References

1929 births
American dentists
2021 deaths
Republican Party members of the Alaska House of Representatives
Military personnel from California
People from Mountain View, California
Politicians from Fairbanks, Alaska
University of Alaska Fairbanks alumni
University of Alaska regents